Sangju Civic Stadium is a multi-purpose stadium in Sangju, South Korea. It is currently used mostly for football matches. The stadium holds 15,042 spectators.

References

External links
 Sangju Stadium Introduction Page
 World Stadiums

Football venues in South Korea
Multi-purpose stadiums in South Korea
Sports venues in North Gyeongsang Province
Sports venues completed in 1992
1992 establishments in South Korea
K League 1 stadiums
K League 2 stadiums
Gimcheon Sangmu FC
20th-century architecture in South Korea